Yavarum Nalam is a 2009 Indian Tamil-language horror film written and directed by Vikram Kumar. The film stars R. Madhavan and Neetu Chandra. Produced by Suresh Balaje and George Pius, the film was simultaneously filmed and released in Hindi as 13B: Fear Has a New Address with a slightly different cast. It was also later dubbed into Telugu as 13-Padamoodu, featuring a few scenes reshot with Ravi Babu. The film's soundtrack was composed by Shankar–Ehsaan–Loy, while Tubby-Parik provided the background score. Released on 6 March 2009, the film received mixed reviews but was commercially successful. Rediff placed the film in its list of top Tamil films of 2009.

Plot 

Manohar moves into a new apartment, 13B, on the 13th floor with his family, fulfilling his life's biggest dream. But they encounter a series of small but strange incidents (such as milk getting spoiled), which are regarded as inauspicious by his family but shrugged off by an excited Manohar. The elevator in the apartment works for everyone in the building except Manohar, which bothers him.

The women in the family get hooked on a new TV show Yavarum Nalam (Everyone Is Well, or Sab Khairiyat in Hindi). The show is about a family eerily similar to Manohar's who have also just moved into a new house as they have. As the serial unfolds, Manohar notices that the incidents that happen in the serial reflect what is happening to his family. He notices that his camera takes distorted pictures of him while he is in the apartment but not while he is outside the apartment. Things like his sister graduating, his wife getting pregnant, and later suffering a miscarriage are all also shown in the serial. Priya is saved by their longtime family friend and doctor, Dr. Shinde/Dr. Balu. The rest of the family remains oblivious to the similarities, and Manohar prefers it that way to avoid panic.

Things take a turn for the worse in the serial, and Manohar becomes terrified that the same might happen to his family. He now wants to know who is behind the making of the TV show. He goes to the production company of the serial and asks about the serial Yavarum Nalam/ Sab Khairiyat. To Manohar's horror, he finds out that Yavarum Nalam/ Sab Khairiyat is a different TV reality show and realizes that the serial appears only in his house, every day at 1 p.m. 
One day Manohar finds their blind neighbour's dog trying to find something in the sand. Manohar stops the dog and takes it to its owner. Later that night, he asks his wife about the latest episode of the serial. She reveals the story to him of the neighbour's dog digging something, and the serial finishes for the day.

Manohar then wakes up at midnight and digs the ground on a rainy night, finding a diary with photographs pasted of the same family coming in the serial. However, there was also a picture of another guy he hadn't seen in the serial in the photos. He then unravels a terrifying secret: the apartment they live in shared their address with a house where a family of eight (similar to Manohar's family) was butchered back in 1977. It was the family of a TV news anchor named Chitra. On the day of Chitra's engagement, an ardent fan, Sairam Shinde, of Chitra, wanted to stop the engagement because he loved her dearly and said to them that if he did not get Chitra, then he would kill everyone without leaving a piece of them. But, he fails in convincing them. So, in sadness, he committed suicide the very next day. It was revealed that all members of Chitra's family were murdered with a hammer on the same day as Sriram's death. The blame rested on the lunatic brother in the family, as he had been seen with the hammer last. The police officer investigating the case also committed suicide by hanging himself in the same house.

Manohar and his policeman friend Shiva meet the mentally disturbed brother Senthil/Ashok (Hindi version), who apparently goes crazy after seeing a TV show in an asylum. They then meet Chitra's former fiancé Ramchandar, who tried to plead for Senthil's/ Ashok's innocence because he got covered in blood while he hugged the bodies of his family. After researching one night, Manohar has a nightmare of the 13B murderer climbing the stairs to kill his family. When Manohar tries to climb the stairs, he always ends up on the 2nd floor. Suddenly, Manohar wakes up from sleep, and he realises that the events that took place, from digging the diary of photographs to the climbing the stairs, are actually happening in his dream. He goes to the hall and witnesses the climax of Yavarum Nalam when they are showing the murderer's identity: Manohar's face is shown as the killer.

Not wanting to risk his family's life, he tells Dr. Balu/Dr. Shinde to book tickets and send his family members somewhere without telling him so that they would be safe.

Balu/Shinde arrives at Manohar's home and gives the flight tickets to Manohar's wife. Suddenly, the television starts when he comes home, and he sees Chitra's Spirit.

The 13B murderer is revealed to be Dr. Balu/Dr. Shinde. He killed them in the 1970s on behalf of his brother, the spurned fan, and also killed the police officer who caught him red-handed. Manohar kills Dr. Balu.

The story ends with Manohar living a normal life with a new dog in the family; the milk is not getting spoiled anymore. They bring Senthil/Ashok home, and the apartment's lift finally works for Manohar. When Manohar uses the lift the next day, he receives a call from Dr. Balu/Dr. Shinde, saying that while the 13B family had haunted the TV, he now haunts Manohar's phone. As the call ends, the elevator drops.

Cast

Production

Development
The director of the film, Vikram Kumar, won a National Award for his short film "Silent Scream". Here he teamed up with cinematographer P. C. Sreeram, editor Sreekar Prasad, sound designer A. S. Lakshminarayanan and art director Sameer Chanda, who also happen to be National Film Award winners. The Hindi working title was Channel.

Casting
Esha Deol and Kareena Kapoor were originally considered for the lead role which eventually went to Neetu Chandra. Lead actress Neetu Chandra made her Tamil debut with Yaavarum Nalam. She has starred in successful Hindi films like Oye Lucky! Lucky Oye! and Traffic Signal. Playback Singer Chinmayi dubbed for Neetu Chandra in this movie. Lead actor Madhavan and cinematographer P. C. Sreeram had previously worked together on the hit movie Alaipayuthey. Veteran Bengali actor Dhritiman Chatterjee made his Tamil cinema debut in Yaavarum Nalam, but Tamil was not a new language for him, as he is a resident of Chennai. He played the same role in the Hindi version of the film. Veteran Marathi actor Sachin Khedekar, who made his debut in Tamil cinema with Yaavarum Nalam, took great effort in learning his lines. A voice CD was sent to him with his lines readout so that he would get familiar with the Tamil dialogue. He plays the same character in the Hindi version as well.

Filming
The majority of the film takes place inside an apartment. A temporary shooting floor was created from scratch in Egmore, Chennai, inside which an elaborate apartment set was erected.

Reception

The film received mixed reviews from critics.

Times of India gave the movie a 3.5/5 rating and said, "Watch out for some zippy cinematography, a stylized monochrome tint, and some snazzy editing. Great timepass. Go for it."

Idlebrain.com gave it 2.5 out of 5 stars and stated, "The first half of the film is a little boring. The way the story unfolds in the second half is good. But the flashback episode and the climax is not shot in a gripping manner. The plus points of the film are the story, cinematography, and Madhavan. The negative points are inconsistent screenplay and runtime. Though it has an interesting plot point, 13B fails due to lack of gripping narration."

Rajeev Masand rated the film 2 out of 5 stars and wrote, "13B is the kind of convenient thriller where you do get a twist ending, but the kind in which anything goes. The logic behind the twist and the back-story to the supernatural premise is so convoluted, it's hardly clever."

Hindustan Times gave the movie 2 out of 5 stars and stated, "If you like horror films, this one's par for the course, especially in the first half, where Vikram K Kumar uses the TV set for an interesting premise, the actors do their bit and the camera picks up suitably weird angles."

Rediff.com rated the film 2 out of 5 stars and said, "One simply wishes it didn't have to be such hard work getting to the point, for the filmmakers as well as the audience."

Taran Adarsh of Bollywood Hungama gave the film 1.5 out of 5 stars and said that "On the whole, 13B is interesting in parts, not in entirety."

Shubhra Gupta of The Indian Express said, "Forget the irritating item numbers. Stay with the film, and you will come to a smart little end, and leave half-smiling, half-wondering: is this what the future holds?"

Film Journal International wrote in their review, "J-horror-styled supernatural thriller from India doesn't have the gore or intensity of the real thing, and for many in the mainstream, that's a relief. Low-budget-looking but effective, with a great central gimmick."

Release
The satellite rights of the film's Tamil version were secured by Kalaignar. The film's Tamil version was given a "U/A" certificate by the Indian Censor Board, but the Hindi version got an "A" certificate from the Censor Board.

Box office
The Tamil version was a blockbuster at the box office, grossing around 13 crore. Yavarum Nalam grossed 2.34 crore in Chennai. The Hindi version grossed only 10 crore and was a commercial failure, according to Box Office India.

Home media
The Tamil version was released on Blu-ray by Moser Baer on 22 October 2010.

Soundtrack
The film's music was composed by Shankar–Ehsaan–Loy, while the lyrics in Hindi and Tamil were penned by Neelesh Mishra and Thamarai respectively.

Tamil

Hindi

See also
List of ghost films

References

External links
 
 BehindWoods.com: "Maddy Vikram combo to be a thrill ride", by Behindwoods News Bureau, 18 December 2007

2009 films
Indian horror thriller films
2009 horror films
Films set in Chennai
Indian multilingual films
Films scored by Shankar–Ehsaan–Loy
Films directed by Vikram Kumar
Films set in apartment buildings
2000s Hindi-language films
2000s Tamil-language films
2000s horror thriller films
Tamil-language psychological thriller films
2009 psychological thriller films
Indian psychological horror films
2009 multilingual films
2000s psychological horror films